AR Cassiopeiae (AR Cas) is a variable star in the constellation of Cassiopeia. It is thought to be a member of a septuple star system, one of only two known star systems with a multiplicity of 7, the other being Nu Scorpii.

Nomenclature
The multiple star system as a whole has the designations ADS 16795, CCDM J23300+5833, and WDS J23300+5833AB in the Aitken Double Star Catalogue, the Catalogue of Components of Double and Multiple Stars, and the Washington Double Star Catalog respectively.

AR Cassiopeiae has been referred to as IH Cas in some literature, looking similar to a variable star designation although not a valid one since the second letter of a variable star designation is always equal to the first or occurs later in the alphabet. The origin of the designation "IH Cassiopeiae" is from the 17th century catalogue and constellation map by Johannes Hevelius, which was kept in use due to the lack of a Flamsteed designation or Bayer designation for the star. It was the first star in Cassiopeia that Flamsteed's edition of Hevelius catalogued, thus "1 Hev. Cas" or "1 H. Cas" (similar to Gould designations), which becomes IH Cas through corruption.

Properties
The primary star system, AR Cassiopeiae, is a triple.  AR Cassiopeiae B is located 0.800″ away from AR Cassiopeiae A. AR Cassiopeiae A itself is an Algol-type eclipsing binary with an orbital period of about 6.07 days. Its primary is a B-type main-sequence star, and the secondary an A-type main-sequence star. The secondary star may be an Am star.

Farther out are two other stars, designated components C and D. They are 76.1″, or about 1.27′, away from the central system. Their combined spectrum matches that of another B-type main-sequence star. This pair is also designated HD 221237.  67.2″ (1.12′) away from AR Cassiopeiae is another pair of stars, F and G, both F-type stars.

All these stars are known to be common proper motion companions.  However, the star listed as component E in most multiple star catalogues is an unrelated background star.

References 

Cassiopeia (constellation)
Algol variables
7
Cassiopeiae, AR
Durchmusterung objects
221253
8926
115990
B-type main-sequence stars